Jessie Mae Robinson (née Booker, October 1, 1918 – October 26, 1966) was an American musician and songwriter, whose compositions included many R&B and pop hits of the 1940s and 1950s, including "Black Night", "I Went To Your Wedding", and  "Let's Have a Party".

Biography
Jessie Mae Booker was born in Call, Texas, but was raised in Los Angeles where she started writing songs in her teens, and met and married Leonard Robinson.  After a few years she began pitching her songs to performers and music publishers.   Her first song to be recorded was "Mellow Man Blues" by Dinah Washington in 1945.   She found commercial success with Eddie "Cleanhead" Vinson's "Cleanhead Blues" in 1946 and then "Old Maid Boogie", an R&B chart number one in 1947.  Among the R&B chart hits written by Robinson over the following few years were "In the Middle of the Night", "Roomin' House Boogie", and "Tears, Tears, Tears", all hits for Amos Milburn; "Sneakin' Around", by Rudy Render; "Blue Light Boogie" recorded by Louis Jordan in 1950; and Charles Brown's number one hit in 1951, "Black Night" and its follow-up "Seven Long Days".

In 1952, Damita Jo recorded Robinson's song "I Went To Your Wedding", which was then covered more successfully by both white pop singer Patti Page, whose version went to number one on the pop chart, and country star Hank Snow.  The song's success allowed Robinson to become "one of the few black songwriters to break the colour barrier", and the first female African-American member of ASCAP.   She wrote further pop hits for Jo Stafford ("Keep It a Secret", 1952; also recorded by Hank Snow) and Frankie Laine ("I'm Just A Poor Bachelor", 1953), as well as "Let's Have a Party", first recorded by Elvis Presley in 1957 and later by Wanda Jackson.  One of her last successes was "The Other Woman", a chart hit for Sarah Vaughan in 1958 and later recorded by Nina Simone and (on her 2014 album Ultraviolence) Lana Del Rey.

After her songwriting career ended, Robinson attempted to start small record labels in the 1960s, but with little success.  She died at home in Los Angeles after a short illness in 1966, aged 48.

References

External links
[ Allmusic's list of Robinson's compositions]

1918 births
1966 deaths
People from Newton County, Texas
Songwriters from Texas
African-American songwriters
20th-century American musicians
American women songwriters
20th-century American women musicians
Songwriters from California
Musicians from Los Angeles
African-American women musicians
20th-century African-American women
20th-century African-American musicians